HeeJin  is the first single album by South Korean girl group Loona's member HeeJin and the first part of the group's pre-debut project. It was released on October 5, 2016, by Blockberry Creative and distributed by CJ E&M. The album contains two tracks, the single "ViViD" and its acoustic mix. Music Videos for both songs were released simultaneously on October 5.

Promotion and release
On October 2, South Korean company Blockberry Creative announced through Naver that they would be debuting their first girl-group through an 18-month long pre-debut project.

Track listing
All lyrics written by GDLO and Park Ji-yeon (MonoTree). All music composed by G-High and Choi Young-kyung (MonoTree). All tracks arranged by G-High (MonoTree).

Charts

References

2016 debut singles
Loona (group) albums
Single albums
Blockberry Creative singles